WCMR may refer to:

 WCMR (AM), a radio station (1270 AM) licensed to serve Elkhart, Indiana, United States
 WCMR-FM, a defunct radio station (94.5 FM) formerly licensed to serve Bruce, Mississippi, United States
 WCMR, acronym for West Coast Midnight Run™, an online digital entertainment art books published since 2005 by Citadel Consulting Group LLC, California, United States